Engaeus orramakunna, the Mount Arthur burrowing crayfish, is a species of crayfish in the family Parastacidae. It is endemic to Australia.

References

Sources
Doran, N. & Horwitz, P. 2010. Engaeus orramakunna. IUCN Red List of Threatened Species 2010. Retrieved 5 February 2017.

Parastacidae
Freshwater crustaceans of Australia
Taxonomy articles created by Polbot
Crustaceans described in 1990